Isabella Gomez (born February 9, 1998) is a Colombian-American actress, best known for starring  in One Day at a Time. Gomez has previously had minor roles in both Modern Family and Matador. She was later cast in a starring role in HBO Max's season 6 revival of the former ABC '80s sitcom television series Head of the Class, which premiered in October 2021.

Biography

In 2020, Gomez was awarded an Impact Award by the National Hispanic Media Coalition for her "Outstanding Performance in a Television Series" on the One Day at a Time reboot on Netflix and Pop.

Early life
Gomez was born in Medellín, Colombia, in 1998. Gomez began acting in commercials at the age of five. Her family later immigrated to Orlando, Florida, when she was ten years old. There, she received lessons from a vocal coach to help moderate her accent. In 2015, her family moved to Los Angeles to improve her ability to pursue an acting career.

Filmography

Film

Television

References

External links

Colombian television actresses
1998 births
Living people
People from Medellín
Actresses from Orlando, Florida
Hispanic and Latino American actresses
Colombian emigrants to the United States
21st-century Colombian actresses
American film actresses
American television actresses
American voice actresses
21st-century American women
American people of Colombian descent